Alexander Fekete (December 2, 1827 —  March 1911) was a Hungarian and American soldier and physician.

Biography 
He was born in né Sándor Fekete, Hungary on December 2, 1827.

During the Hungarian Revolution of 1848, he fought as a soldier under the flags of Lajos Kossuth. He was imprisoned in the Austrian Empire. He escaped to the Ottoman Empire. He moved to the United States in 1852, where he settled in East St. Louis. He learned medicine here, where later practiced as well. When American Civil War broke out, he entered to the 5th Missouri Regiment where he became major. He was a doctor at the 13th Chivalry Regiment of Missouri.

After the end of Civil War, he returned to East St. Louis, where he became major of the town and later he was appointed as a postmaster. He died there at the beginning of March, 1911.

Sources 

Magyarok Amerikában : az amerikai magyarság története : 1583–1926. 1. köt. / Kende Géza. – 1927. 375 p. Fekete Sándor see 365. p.

Hungarian soldiers
Hungarian emigrants to the United States
19th-century American physicians
United States Army officers
1827 births
1911 deaths